Romain Grau (born 21 June 1974) is a French politician of La République En Marche! (LREM) who served as member of the French National Assembly from 2017 to 2022, representing Pyrénées-Orientales's 1st constituency.

Early life and education
Born into a family of winemakers from Villemolaque, Grau is a graduate of Sciences Po and École nationale d'administration (ENA).

Political career
In parliament, Grau served as member of the Finance Committee. 

In July 2019, Grau voted in favor of the French ratification of the European Union’s Comprehensive Economic and Trade Agreement (CETA) with Canada. Shortly after, his office in Perpignan was set on fire while he was inside during anti-government protests of the Yellow vests movement. In 2022, he received a punch in the chin at a protest against the vaccine passport during the COVID-19 pandemic.

Grau lost his seat in the second round of the 2022 French legislative election to Sophie Blanc from the National Rally.

See also
 2017 French legislative election

References

1974 births
Living people
Deputies of the 15th National Assembly of the French Fifth Republic
La République En Marche! politicians
Place of birth missing (living people)
Union of Democrats and Independents politicians

Members of Parliament for Pyrénées-Orientales